Mariadöttrarna av den Evangeliska Mariavägen (Daughters of Mary of the Evangelical Way of Mary) is a Lutheran religious order for women in the Church of Sweden, with chapters also in Kruså in Denmark and in Naantali in Finland.

The order was founded by Paulina Mariadotter (Gunvor Paulina Norrman 1903–1985) in the middle of the 20th century. Swedish communities of the order live in Vallby near Enköping and in Malmö.

Sisters wear blue habit and make wows of poverty, chastity and obedience. One branch of the order, the community in Vadstena, has adopted the rule of St Benedict and since 1988 belonged to the Roman Catholic Church.

External links
Official website  

Church of Sweden
Lutheran orders and societies